The 2016 Soeratin Cup season is a football competition which is intended for footballers born before 1 January 1999.  This season is managed by competition committee of Province Association for qualification round and managed by PT. GTS in national round. The national round started on 19 November 2016.

Format
Each Provincial Association only given one representative to the national round. 30 teams will perform in the final round, consist of 30 teams of provincial competition winners. 
National round took place in Central Java and Special Region of Yogyakarta.

Teams
Each Provincial Association only given one representative to the national round. Jakarta, West Kalimantan, West Papua, and Papua did not send its representative.

Sumatra Region

Java Region

Kalimantan Region

Sulawesi Region

Bali and Nusa Tenggara Region

Maluku and Papua Region

National Round
National round will take place in Central Java and Special Region of Yogyakarta.

Group stage
30 teams from each provincial association will compete. Matches for the Group stage will be played from 19–25 November 2016. All group will play half season round-robin.

Group A 
This group will be held in Jenderal Hoegeng Stadium, Pekalongan and Moh Sarengat Stadium, Batang Regency.

Match 1

Match 2

Match 3

Group B 
This group will be held in Jatidiri Stadium, Semarang and Citarum Stadium, Semarang.

Match 1

Match 2

Match 3

Group C 
This group will be held in Pandanaran Stadium, Ungaran.

Match 1

Match 2

Match 3

Group D 
This group will be held in Gelora Bumi Kartini Stadium, Jepara.

Match 1

Match 2

Match 3

Group E 
This group will be held in Wergu Wetan Stadium, Kudus.

Match 1

Match 2

Match 3

Group F 
This group will be held in Moch. Soebroto Stadium, Magelang and Gemilang Stadium, Magelang Regency.

Match 1

Match 2

Match 3

Group G 
This group will be held in Sriwedari Stadium, Surakarta.

Match 1

Match 2

Match 3

Group H 
This group will be held in Sultan Agung Stadium, Bantul.

Match 1

Match 2

Match 3

Knockout stage

Round of 16

Quarter-finals
Matches for Quarter-finals will be played at 3 December 2016.

Semi-finals
Matches for Semi-finals will be played at 7 December 2016.

Third Place
Matches for Third Place Play-off will be played at 10 December 2016.

Final
Matches for Final were played on 10 December 2016.

Champions

See also
 2016 Indonesia Soccer Championship A
 2016 Indonesia Soccer Championship B
 2016 Indonesia Soccer Championship U-21
 2016 Liga Nusantara

References

Soeratin Cup